C. Ponnambalam (Cathiravelu Ponnambalam) was the First Mayor of Jaffna.

Biography
Ponnambalam hailed from a distinguished Tamil family from Jaffna. His father Arumugam Cathiravelu was a Magistrate and District Judge. His own brother Cathiravelu Sittampalam was the first Cabinet Minister of Posts and Telecommunications in the independent Sri Lanka. His uncle Arumugam Canagaratnam was the Chairman of the first Urban Council of Jaffna and built and founded Canagaratnam Maha Vidyalayam. Ponnambalam's grand uncle Viswanather Casipillai was a Crown Proctor and co-founder of the Jaffna Hindu College. His brother-in-law C. Casipillai was the Third Mayor of Jaffna.

See also 
List of political families in Sri Lanka

References

Sri Lankan Tamil politicians
Sri Lankan Hindus
Alumni of Royal College, Colombo
Mayors of Jaffna